Moretown is a town in Washington County, Vermont, United States. The population was 1,753 at the 2020 census.

History
Moretown Village was devastated in 2011 by Hurricane Irene. More than 60 homes and buildings flooded, including the post office, the town offices, the church, the school and the fire station.

In 1913, 125 acres were purchased in North Moretown and a talc processing facility was built. To this day, the old structure remains a town landmark in disrepair.

Geography

Demographics

As of the census of 2000, there were 1,653 people, 650 households, and 436 families residing in the town.  The population density was 41.2 people per square mile (15.9/km2).  There were 727 housing units at an average density of 18.1 per square mile (7.0/km2).  The racial makeup of the town was 98.19% White, 0.12% Native American, 0.79% Asian, 0.12% from other races, and 0.79% from two or more races. Hispanic or Latino of any race were 0.67% of the population.

There were 650 households, out of which 35.7% had children under the age of 18 living with them, 55.1% were married couples living together, 8.6% had a female householder with no husband present, and 32.8% were non-families. 22.3% of all households were made up of individuals, and 7.7% had someone living alone who was 65 years of age or older.  The average household size was 2.54 and the average family size was 3.01.

In the town, the population was spread out, with 26.6% under the age of 18, 5.2% from 18 to 24, 31.8% from 25 to 44, 27.0% from 45 to 64, and 9.4% who were 65 years of age or older.  The median age was 38 years. For every 100 females, there were 99.6 males.  For every 100 females age 18 and over, there were 97.2 males.

The median income for a household in the town was $47,750, and the median income for a family was $52,202. Males had a median income of $35,270 versus $26,719 for females. The per capita income for the town was $20,283.  About 5.4% of families and 6.6% of the population were below the poverty line, including 5.6% of those under age 18 and 7.9% of those age 65 or over.

Economy 

Moretown has one retail store, The Moretown General Store, which serves as a gas station, convenience store and delicatessen. The Moretown general store is the center of the town, which often serves as a meeting place and is in many ways a community center.

Moretown is also home to many successful entrepreneurs in fields such as real estate, carpentry, baking, plumbing, and other trades; however, most residents commute to work in other towns with larger economies such as Montpelier and Burlington.

Moretown also has several small farms, a clapboard mill, three churches, one elementary school, a small library, and a town hall.

Notable people 

 Matthew H. Carpenter, US senator from Wisconsin
 Harvey Clapp, member of the Wisconsin State Assembly, was born in Moretown

References

External links
 
 Town of Moretown official website

 
Towns in Vermont
Towns in Washington County, Vermont